Sendje Hydroelectric Power Station is a  hydroelectric power station under construction in Equatorial Guinea. The power station is under development by the Government of Equatorial Guinea, with funds borrowed from the Development Bank of Central African States (BDEAC). The engineering, procurement and construction (EPC) contractor for this project is Duglas Alliance, a Ukrainian multinational engineering and construction company.

Location

Overview
The power station is designed with maximum generation capacity of 200 megawatts, derived from four Alstom turbines, each rated at 50 megawatts. When fully operational, the power station's energy will be distributed to the main urban centers on the mainland, including Bata, Mbini, Kogo, Añisok, Mongomo and Ebebiyin. This power station together with the 120 megawatts Djibloho Hydroelectric Power Station, form the "backbone" of the country's hydroelectric energy capacity.

Construction costs and funding
The construction budget is reported to be €467 million (US$531 million). The cost was met by the government of Equatorial Guinea, with partial funding in form of a loan of €122 million (US$137 million), provided by BDEAC. Construction began in 2012 and was expected to conclude in 2020.

Benefits
When fully operational, this power station will increase national generational capacity to 590 megawatts. It will add 1,042 GWh to the national electric output, in form of "clean renewable energy", increasing access to grid-power, reducing the cost of electricity in the country and promoting national economic growth.

See also

List of power stations in Equatorial Guinea

References

External links
 Route Marker Showing Bata And Senye With Map

Power stations in Equatorial Guinea
Hydroelectric power stations in Equatorial Guinea